Qasr al-Mukharram is a Syrian village located in the Suran Subdistrict in Hama District. According to the Syria Central Bureau of Statistics (CBS), Qasr al-Makhram had a population of 552 in the 2004 census.

References 

Populated places in Hama District